Samna (Marathi: सामना) is a 1974 Marathi-language crime drama directed by Jabbar Patel. It was entered into the 25th Berlin International Film Festival.

Cast

 Mohan Agashe as Maruti Kamble
 Anant Audkar
 Shivaji Bhosle
 Sanjivani Bidkar as Mrs. Patil
 Rajni Chauhan
 Jayant Dharmadhikari
 Aswel Guruji
 Bhalchandra Kulkarni
 Shreeram Lagoo as Master
 Uday Lagoo
 Gulab Latkar
 Salim Latkar
 Usha Naik as Suhini
 Nandu Paranjpe
 Smita Patil as Kamley
 Nilu Phule as Hindurao Dhonde Patil

Plot
A middle-aged penniless drunkard arrives at a sleepy village in a bus. At the bus-stand people are talking something about some "Maruti Kamble" in a hushed tone. The news of his arrival reaches the sugar baron Mr. Hindurao Dhonde-Patil through his henchman who expresses his doubt that the drunkard may be a sleuth sent by the central government. Hindurao is worried. Hindurao invites the drunkard to his mansion and provides him space to live in order to keep an eye on him. He asks the drunkard some direct questions like who he is and where he comes from. But the drunkard dodges his questions by giving some philosophical or imbecile answers. He does not even reveal his name. Hindurao decides to call him "Master" (teacher). Hindurao tells Master how backward this village was and how Hindurao worked hard for the progress of the village. Now there is a sugar factory, poultry, school, etc. for the village. Master observes that the progress is not of the village but only of Hindurao. Master is perpetually drunk and again overhears people asking "what became of “Maruti Kamble". He asks people about Maruti Kamble but they suddenly become silent. When Hindurao discovers that Master is enquiring about Maruti Kamble, he worries. Finally he calls him and makes a pact with him. The pact is that Hindurao would tell Master everything about Maruti Kamble and Master will stop his enquiries and leave the village. Hindurao says that Maruti Kamble was a military man and posed a challenge to Mr Hindurao's economic and political progress, so Hindurao falsely implicated him in a crime. He alleged that Maruti Kamble had extra marital affair with a widow. The villagers could not tolerate such immoral behaviour. Maruti Kamble thought that people would believe the charges to be true and try to kill him, so he tried to run away. Before police could get him, Hindurao had Maruti Kamble murdered and people thought that Maruti Kamble had run away to escape villagers' wrath, though some people had their "doubts". As Hindurao had told the truth about Maruti Kamble, it is Master's turn to leave the village. But Master is a man of conscience. Master had fought in the independence struggle of India and is pained to see that though people had become free of the British rule, they are again being exploited by persons like Hindurao. Now should he fight against the tyranny of Hindurao too? Master leaves the village. Outside the village, at the district headquarters, people notice that Master has made a demand to the government that an enquiry be made into the misdeeds of Maruti Kamble and that Maruti Kamble be found and brought to justice. Master has also decided to fast until his demand is met and he is ready to fast until death. Hindurao anticipates the results and contacts district administrator and politicians, but they show no inclination to help him out. Hindurao tries to give a speech in order to divert the attention of people from the topic of Maruti Kamble but people ask "What became of Maruti Kamble ?" and shout him down. Hindurao runs away to Mumbai and in his absence chaos spreads in the management of his factory and poultry. Other politicians are eager to fill in this vacuum. Master reaches Hindurao's hideout and persuades him to face the reality and surrender in order to give himself a chance. Finally Hindurao surrenders to the police. As police handcuff Hindurao in front of villagers and lead him to the police vehicle, Hindurao turns to Master and gives only a smile without malice. There ends the confrontation (Saamana) between a penniless drunkard and a potentate.

Soundtrack

The music for Samana is composed by Bhaskar M. Chandravarkar and the lyrics are by, Jagdish Khebudkar, Jabbar Patel and Aarti Prabhu.

Awards and nominations

References

External links

1974 films
1970s Marathi-language films
1974 crime drama films
Films directed by Jabbar Patel
Indian black-and-white films
Films with screenplays by Vijay Tendulkar
Best Marathi Feature Film National Film Award winners
Indian crime drama films